Sevak Amroyan (born July 10, 1990) is an Armenian singer, who is best known as the winner of Shant TV's folk music competition .

Early life
Amroyan was born in the capital Yerevan, but grew up in the village of Proshyan, Kotayk Province, where he went to school.

Career
Amroyan came to prominence in 2007, after winning the first season of Shant TV's folk music competition  (Folk Singer). Since then he has released multiple singles such as "", "" and "" with millions of views on YouTube. In 2015, he recorded the song "" with Mher Mesropyan amid the 100th anniversary of the Armenian genocide, with the music video being shot in the Genocide Memorial in Yerevan. In 2016, Amroyan released his debut album, . One of the songs from the album, "" featuring Nune Yesayan, received an award at Armenia TV's Song of the Year Awards in 2017. In 2019, he was chosen as one of the four judges for Shant TV's  (National Singer) music competition.

In August 2020, his second album  was released. The album's title refers to the Armenian martial dance Yarkhushta. In November 2020, amid the Nagorno-Karabakh war he was featured on a charity single titled "" (Nothing Will Win Us) along with Arthur Khachents, Iveta Mukuchyan, Gor Sujyan, Srbuk, Sevak Khanagyan and Sona Rubenyan, produced by DerHova. Following the end of the war, he was featured on another collaboration track along with Mihran Tsarukyan, Hayko and Erik Karapetyan titled "" dedicated to Armenian soldiers.

In June 2022, Amroyan was featured on the single "Amber" by Armenian-American singer Serj Tankian.

Musical style
He is known for his folk songs, as well as patriotic songs about Armenia and its army. While talking about singing in pop genre in an interview, Amroyan said: "No, I'm not thinking about it. Maybe there will be some collaborations, but that's all. Of course, folk music is not as popular in Armenia as pop, but I hope that the situation will improve. Every effort should be made to make folk music a priority".

Personal life
On December 8, 2021, Amroyan was married.

Discography

Studio albums
 (2016)

 (2020)

 (2022)

Accolades
2007: Shant TV's Folk Singer show winner
2017: Armenia TV's Song of the Year award for "" (with Nune Yesayan)
2019: Armenia TV's Song of the Year award for ""

References

External links 
Sevak Amroyan's channel on YouTube

1990 births
Living people
Musicians from Yerevan
21st-century Armenian male singers
Armenian folk singers